Michel Pensée Billong (born 16 June 1973 in Yaoundé) is a Cameroonian former professional footballer who played as a defender. He enjoyed a geographically varied career which took in spells with teams in his native Cameroon, Mexico, South Korea, Portugal, Russia, Japan and England. In England he scored once for MK Dons against Barnsley. He was a part of the Cameroonian 1998 FIFA World Cup side.

Club career
In January 2005, Pensée signed for Milton Keynes Dons on a contract until the end of the season.

Career statistics

Club

International

Honors
Cheonan Ilhwa Chunma
 Korean FA Cup: 1999

Cameroon
 African Cup of Nations: 2000

References

External links
 
 
 
 

Living people
1973 births
Footballers from Yaoundé
Association football defenders
Cameroonian footballers
Cameroonian expatriate footballers
Cameroon international footballers
Tampico Madero F.C. footballers
Seongnam FC players
C.D. Aves players
FC Anzhi Makhachkala players
Sanfrecce Hiroshima players
Milton Keynes Dons F.C. players
Liga MX players
K League 1 players
Primeira Liga players
Russian Premier League players
J1 League players
English Football League players
Expatriate footballers in Mexico
Expatriate footballers in South Korea
Expatriate footballers in Portugal
Expatriate footballers in Russia
Expatriate footballers in Japan
Expatriate footballers in England
1998 FIFA World Cup players
2000 African Cup of Nations players
2001 FIFA Confederations Cup players
Cameroonian expatriate sportspeople in Mexico
Cameroonian expatriate sportspeople in Portugal
Cameroonian expatriate sportspeople in Russia
Cameroonian expatriate sportspeople in Japan
Cameroonian expatriate sportspeople in England